Julius Clementz (24 May 1890 – 3 August 1961) was a Norwegian footballer. He played in two matches for the Norway national football team in 1910 and 1911.

References

External links
 

1890 births
1961 deaths
Norwegian footballers
Norway international footballers
Footballers from Oslo
Association football goalkeepers